General Garrett may refer to:

Michael X. Garrett (born 1961), U.S. Army four-star general
Ragnar Garrett (1900–1977), Australian Army lieutenant general
Robert Garrett (British Army officer) (1794–1869), British Army lieutenant general
Tracy L. Garrett (fl. 1970s–2010s), U.S. Marine Corps Reserve major general
William B. Garrett III (fl. 1980s–2010s), U.S. Army lieutenant general

See also
Isham Warren Garrott (1816–1863), Confederate States Army colonel set to be promoted to brigadier general, but killed in action before the promotion occurred